"Sunrise" is a song by Irish band the Divine Comedy, and is the tenth and final track on their 1998 album Fin de Siècle.

Background
The song is about songwriter Neil Hannon's upbringing during the Troubles in Northern Ireland, and refers to Derry and Enniskillen (as well as Derry's official name, Londonderry, and Enniskillen's Irish name).

The song has been acclaimed for its poignant subject matter and is one of Hannon's most popular compositions. It has been played regularly in concerts.

References

Songs written by Neil Hannon
Songs about The Troubles (Northern Ireland)
The Divine Comedy (band) songs
Year of song missing